Śródmieście, also known by its anglicized name Downtown, and colloquially referred to as Centre, is a district of the city of Warsaw, Poland. The best known neighbourhoods in the borough are the Old Town and New Town.

The area is home to the most important national and municipal institutions, many businesses, higher education establishments (e.g. University of Warsaw, Warsaw University of Technology and Medical Academy) and theatres. It is also home to most of the tourist attractions in Warsaw.

The district has an area of 15.57 km2 (6.01 sq mi), and in 2022, it was inhabited by 101 979 people.

Subdivisions 
 Old Town
 New Town
 Muranów
 Śródmieście Północne (north Śródmieście)
 Śródmieście Południowe (south Śródmieście)
Frascati (historical)
 Powiśle
 Mariensztat
 Solec, Warsaw
 Ujazdów

Notes

References

External links